The House of Scientists in Odesa is a public institution established in 1923 to unite scientists from various scientific institutions and higher schools in the Odesa area. It was one of a number of Houses of Scientists established across the Soviet Union and the first established in Ukraine.

The building is housed in the former palace of the Counts Tolstoy. It was taken over by the House of Scientists in 1934.

During the Second World War, the building was occupied by the Romanian Army. However the German military commander of the occupation discovered this and put a stop to the looting and stabling of horses which was going on. Instead he summoned all the scientists who had not fled the city to attend the House of Scientists, thus obliging them to give the impression they supported the Axis occupation.

References

Houses of Scientists
Scientific organizations established in 1923
Scientific organizations based in Ukraine